Mia Regina (stylized as Mia REGINA) is a Japanese idol group from Tokyo signed to Lantis and affiliated with Dear Stage. Consisting of Waka Kirishima, Fūri Uebana, and Risuko Sasakama, the group began its activities in 2016, and has released 10 singles and three albums as of 2022. Its music has been featured in anime series such as Hensuki, Appare-Ranman!, and The Aquatope on White Sand.

History
The group began its activities in 2016. Its members include Waka Kirishima, Fūri Uebana, and Risuko Sasakama, all of whom were also members of the Star Anis idol group associated with the anime series Aikatsu. Their first single  was released on August 24, 2016; the title track was used as the ending theme to the anime series Momokuri. Their next single  was released on October 26, 2016, with the title song being used as the opening theme to the anime series Matoi the Sacred Slayer.

The group released the single "My Sweet Maiden/Welcome To Our Diabolic Paradise" on April 26, 2017; the title tracks were used as the opening and ending themes respectively to the anime series Seven Mortal Sins. This was followed by the release of the single "Dear Teardrop" on February 28, 2018; the title song was used as the ending theme to the anime series Citrus.

They released the single  on August 21, 2019; the title song was used as the ending theme to the anime series Hensuki. In 2021 they released the single ; the title track was used as the first ending theme to the anime series The Aquatope on White Sand.

Discography

Albums

Singles

References

External links
Official website 

Anime musical groups
Japanese idol groups
Lantis (company) artists
Musical groups established in 2016
Musical groups from Tokyo